Helmut Kassner (born 26 December 1946, in Dachau) is a German former professional Grand Prix motorcycle road racer. His best season was in 1974 when he won the 350cc and 250cc German Grand Prix. The German round was boycotted by the top racers over safety concerns due to a lack of hay bales at the Nürburgring race circuit. He is the younger brother of Horst Kassner.

References

1946 births
Living people
German motorcycle racers
500cc World Championship riders